Om Prakash Kohli (9 August 1935 – 20 February 2023) was an Indian politician who was the Governor of Gujarat from 2014 to 2019. He was the president of the Delhi unit of Bharatiya Janata Party from 1999 to 2000 and had served as a member of the Rajya Sabha from 1994 to 2000. He had been the president of the Delhi University Teacher's Association (DUTA) and of the ABVP. He studied at Ramjas School and Khalsa School, New Delhi. Kohli was a Master of Arts in Hindi from the University of Delhi and a lecturer at Hansraj College and Deshbandhu College for over 37 years. He was arrested under MISA during the Emergency.

From 8 September 2016 to 19 January 2018, he held the additional charge of the office of Governor of Madhya Pradesh along with Gujarat. He was also designated as the Chancellor of Gujarat Ayurved University, Jamnagar. 

Kohli had a son (Vishu Kohli) and two daughters (Ritu Kohli & Suparna Khurana). He died on 20 February 2023, at the age of 87.

References

|-

|-

|-

1935 births
2023 deaths
Governors of Gujarat
People from Delhi
Indians imprisoned during the Emergency (India)
Academic staff of Delhi University
Rajya Sabha members from Delhi
Bharatiya Janata Party politicians from Delhi